Royal Oak is a residential neighbourhood in the northwest quadrant of Calgary, Alberta. It is located close to the northwestern edge of the city and is bounded to the north by Country Hills Boulevard, to the east by Stoney Trail, to the south by Crowchild Trail and to the west by Rocky Ridge Road.
Royal Oak is located near Rocky Ridge, Calgary.

The land was annexed to the City of Calgary in 1989 (from the Municipal District of Rocky View), and Royal Oak was established in 1997. It is represented in the Calgary City Council by the Ward 2 councillor.

Demographics

Residents in this community had a median household income of $110,906 in 2010, and there were no low income residents living in the neighborhood.

See also
 List of neighbourhoods in Calgary

References

External links
 Rocky Ridge-Royal Oak Community Association

Neighbourhoods in Calgary